= Tom Berhus =

Norwegian footballer (born 1975)

Personal information
- Date of birth: 12 January 1975 (age 51)
- Position: Defender

Youth career
- Start

Senior career*
Years	Team	Apps	(Gls)
1995–2006	Start		
- * Club domestic league appearances and goals

Tom Berhus (born 12 January 1975) is a retired Norwegian football midfielder.
